TEDA Global Academy (formerly TEDA International School)  is an English language day school located in Tianjin Economic Development Area of China.

The school was established by the TEDA Government in 1995, and is open to any foreigners residing in TEDA. Its campus consists of six modern, climate-controlled buildings housing general classrooms; science labs; computer labs; library/media center; ESL classrooms; a full-sized gymnasium and a large cafeteria. The campus grounds are a park-like setting that includes a playground, a football field, and a track.

The School is a member of EARCOS (East Asia Regional Council of Overseas Schools) and is accredited by  WASC. TGA is also a member of Association of China and Mongolia International Schools (ACAMIS) and participates in intramural sports and cultural activities regularly through this organization.

References 

International schools in Tianjin
East Asia Regional Council of Overseas Schools
Educational institutions established in 1995
1995 establishments in China